"Siempre Contigo" ("Always with You") is a written and produced by Rafael Pérez-Botija and performed by Mexican entertainer Lucero on the 1994 album of the same name. It was released as a lead single on the days leading up to the release date of the album. The song, along with the entire album, marked a return for Lucero to recording ballads following her ranchera album, Cariño de Mis Cariños, also released in the same year. Pérez-Botija had previously collaborated with Lucero composing hit songs like "Electricidad". The song became her first and (to date) only number one hit on the Billboard Latin Pop Airplay chart in 1995. The song has been covered by Tejana singer Emily on her 1999 album of the same name.

Charts

Weekly charts

Year-end charts

See also
List of number-one Billboard Latin Pop Airplay songs of 1995

References

Lucero (entertainer) songs
1994 singles
1994 songs
Fonovisa Records singles